Ludwigsdorf is a village and a former municipality in Saxony, Germany. It belongs to Görlitz since 1 January 1999. It has 757 inhabitants (July 2021). Together with the village Ober-Neundorf it is the northernmost part of the city.

History 
The church of Ludwigsdorf was built by 1175, according to the newest dendrochronological investigations.  According to that, Ludwigsdorf presumably was founded in the course of the German Ostsiedlung. It is obvious that when the church was built there had to be a certain prosperity yet to manage the building and maintenance of the church. Most of the grubbing and construction phase must have been ended in 1175.

The type of the settlement is a Waldhufendorf. Under the name Lodewigesdorph (village of Louis) it was mentioned first in 1305, in 1413 it was written Lodewigisdorf, in 1430 Ludwigsdorff, in 1534 Lustorf and in 1559 Lostorf.

In February and March 1431 the Hussites were in Ludwigsdorf. Because 1539 the council of Görlitz bought the village from Urban Emrich, it belonged to Görlitz once before the incorporation in 1999. In 1621 Lord of Salza auf Ebersbach bought it. About 1665 it was probably the divided into Upper- and Lower-Ludwigsdorf. At the time of the War of the Sixth Coalition, from 1813 till 1816, Lower-Ludwigsdorf was afflicted with military billeting, according to the records of the then head of the municipality Gottlieb Winkler.

Since 1950 Ober-Neundorf has belonged to Ludwigsdorf. About that time the two parts Upper- and Lower-Ludwigsdorf were no longer mentioned separately.

Sights 
 
 
Parish church

The church of Ludwigsdorf is mentioned first 1346 in the Meißner Bistumsmatrikel.
The distinct higher age of the building could be documented with the help of dendrochronological investigations. According to that the choir was already completed shortly after 1175, the Saal (spezial form of a hall) about 1192.  Apparently it was originally intended as a Saal church aisleless church with Chorquadrat and Apse. This represents a type widespread in Central Germany.  The high age of the church of Ludwigsdorf gives reason to rethink again the beginning and process of the Ostsiedlung. Previously it was assumed that not until around 1200 a great many of settlers came to the Neisse Valley.

Maybe already at the beginning of the 13th century, the choir was extended to a tower, so the church of Ludwigsdorf is since then a type of a choir tower church :de:Chorturmkirche, which is rare in Upper Lusatia.
The roof framework of the choir was used again for the tower roof and so remained completely intact.

The water mill

The water mill is in Lower Ludwigsdorf at the Mühlgraben, a branch of the river Neisse.
Previously, the mill was used to mill flour. Today there is a gastronomic event with the special atmosphere of a former mill .

Economy and Transportation 

There is a customs office Ludwigsdorf at the motorway border crossing.

Literature 
 Noky/Oelsner/Frenchkowsky: Dachwerke des 12. Jahrhundert in der OL. Ein Zwischenbericht zu den Untersuchungen an der Kirche zu Ludwigsdorf bei Görlitz. In: Denkmalpflege in Görlitz. 14. 2005, S. 5–12

References

External links 

 History of the village
 History of the church

Görlitz
Germany–Poland border crossings
Former municipalities in Saxony